Archer Lodge is a town in Johnston County, North Carolina, United States. Its population was 4,292 as of the 2010 census, and as of 2018 the estimated population was 5,014.

History
A Masonic lodge named Archer No. 157 was established by the Grand Lodge of Ancient, Free, and Accepted Masons of North Carolina on December 6, 1854, at what was then known as Creachville. In 1865, the lodge building was razed and the charter destroyed by Gen. William T. Sherman's Union Army on their way to Raleigh. The lodge received a new charter after the war, but a clerical error resulted in a misnumeration, and it was designated Archer Lodge No. 165.

The community has had several post offices over the years. The first was called "Creachville", which existed from 1851 to 1866. This was followed by Archer Lodge (1877–1896). It was known as "Archer" from 1896 to 1912, when it closed. After 1912, the area was covered by either the Clayton or Wendell post offices.

The people of Archer Lodge voted on November 3, 2009, to incorporate Archer Lodge as a town. The vote was certified one week later.

Geography
The town is within the Neuse River watershed.

Demographics

2020 census

As of the 2020 United States census, there were 4,797 people, 1,648 households, and 1,393 families residing in the town.

Growth
The Archer Lodge community is one of the fastest growing areas of Johnston County. A new middle school, Archer Lodge Middle School, opened in 2007, and the new high school, Corinth Holders High School, opened its doors in 2010 northeast of the town limits.

Incorporation
In early 2007, the process of incorporating the community of Archer Lodge was started. Three public meetings were held, and a petition was circulated. In August 2009, a bill to create the Town of Archer Lodge passed both the NC House and Senate. On November 3, 2009, a referendum vote was held. The referendum passed by a vote of 429 for and 318 against.

Landmarks
The most significant landmark in the community is C.E. Barnes Store, which has been in operation for over 75 years. The old Masonic Lodge used to be located right next door. The building that used to be the boarding house for the teachers at Archer Lodge School still stands next to the ball park and is being used as a private residence. White Oak Baptist Church stands at the heart of the community. The church used to be known as the Archer Lodge Missionary Baptist Church, but changed its name when it moved to its current location under a stand of white oak trees.

References

External links
 
 Archer Lodge Community Center
 Archer Lodge Fire Department
 White Oak Baptist Church

Towns in Johnston County, North Carolina
Towns in North Carolina
Populated places established in 1851
1851 establishments in North Carolina